Xenopipo is a genus of bird in the family Pipridae.

Etymology
Xenopipo:  xenos “stranger”; New  “manakin”.

Species
It contains the following species:
 Black manakin (Xenopipo atronitens)
 Olive manakin (Xenopipo uniformis)

References

 
Bird genera
Taxonomy articles created by Polbot